The Cool Notes were a mid-1980s pop/funk group who had a string of chart hits in the UK between 1984 and 1986. The band, which formed in South London, consisted of seven members of both vocal and instrumental talent. They are best known for their UK number 11 hit, "Spend the Night".

Discography

Studio albums

Compilation albums
 Best of the Cool Notes (1990)
 The Unreleased Demos (2012)
 The PWL Dayz (2016)

Singles

References

External links
 

English pop music groups
English funk musical groups
British soul musical groups
British post-disco music groups
Musical groups established in 1979
Musical groups disestablished in 1991